French Pass is a gap in the mountains of Northeast Oregon, US, within Morrow County in an unpopulated region of the state.

Geography of Morrow County, Oregon